Desulforegula  is a bacteria genus from the order Desulfobacterales.

References

Further reading 
 

Desulfobacterales
Bacteria genera
Monotypic bacteria genera